Ricardo Benasseni (born 26 September 1890, date of death unknown) was an Italian racing cyclist. He rode in the 1925 Tour de France.

References

1890 births
Year of death missing
Italian male cyclists
Place of birth missing